Ilya Shalamitski (born November 12, 1984 in Minsk) is a Belarusian male curler, professional tennis player and tennis coach. He is left-handed.

Achievements
Belarusian Mixed Doubles Curling Championship: gold (2016, 2019), silver (2018).

Teams and events

Men's

Mixed

Mixed doubles

References

External links
 
 
 Шоломицкий Илья Николевич — Республиканский центр олимпийской подготовки по теннису  
 Шоломицкий Илья — Aqua Tennis Club 

1984 births
Living people
Belarusian male curlers
Belarusian curling champions
Belarusian male tennis players
Belarusian tennis coaches
Sportspeople from Minsk